Marie Metze (born December 24, 1938) is an American politician who has served in the Georgia House of Representatives from the 55th district since 2015.

References

1938 births
Living people
Democratic Party members of the Georgia House of Representatives
21st-century American politicians
21st-century American women politicians
Women state legislators in Georgia (U.S. state)